The Shan United Revolutionary Army (abbreviated SURA) or Tai Revolutionary Council (TRC) was a Shan insurgent group in Myanmar (Burma), led by Moh Heng.

History
The SURA was formed in the 1960s by Moh Heng, who earlier formed the Shan State Communist Party in 1956.  

The SURA however took anti-communist position due to its close links with the KMT. In 1984, it merged with the anti-communist 2nd Brigade of the Shan State Army to form the Tai Revolutionary Council (TRC) when the 2nd Brigade headquarters was overrun by Khun Sa's Shan United Army (SUA).  

In early 1985 its headquarters at Piang Luang came under pressure from the SUA as the latter sought to consolidate control over the border area.  The TRC then ended its relationship the KMT, and allied itself with the SUA, to create the Mong Tai Army with its base of operations in Homong. In 1996 most of its soldiers disarmed, but a group of 800 soldiers were integrated into the newly formed Shan State Army - South by Yawd Serk.

Further reading
 Trevor Wilson (ed.) Myanmar's Long Road to National Reconciliation, Institute of Southeast Asian Studies, 2006, ; 981-230-363-4

See also
 Mong Tai Army
 Opium production in Myanmar

References

Rebel groups in Myanmar
Shan militia groups
Paramilitary organisations based in Myanmar